In mathematics, a diffiety is a geometrical object which plays the same role in the modern theory of partial differential equations that algebraic varieties play for algebraic equations, that is, to encode the space of solutions in a more conceptual way. The term was coined in 1984 by Alexandre Mikhailovich Vinogradov as portmanteau from differential variety.

Intuitive definition
In algebraic geometry the main objects of study (varieties) model the space of solutions of a system of algebraic equations (i.e. the zero locus of a set of polynomials), together with all their "algebraic consequences". This means that, applying algebraic operations to this set (e.g. adding those polynomials to each other or multiplying them with any other polynomials) will give rise to the same zero locus. In other words, one can actually consider the zero locus of the algebraic ideal generated by the initial set of polynomials.

When dealing with differential equations, apart from applying algebraic operations as above, one has also the option to differentiate the starting equations, obtaining new differential constraints. Therefore, the differential analogue of a variety should be the space of solutions of a system of differential equations, together with all their "differential consequences". Instead of considering the zero locus of an algebraic ideal, one needs therefore to work with a differential ideal.

An elementary diffiety will consist therefore of the infinite prolongation of a differential equation , together with an extra structure provided by a special distribution. Elementary diffieties play the same role in the theory of differential equations as affine algebraic varieties do in the theory of algebraic equations. Accordingly, just like varieties or schemes are composed of irreducible affine varieties or affine schemes, one defines a (non-elementary) diffiety as an object that locally looks like an elementary diffiety.

Formal definition 
The formal definition of a diffiety, which relies on the geometric approach to differential equations and their solutions, requires the notions of jets of submanifolds, prolongations, and Cartan distribution, which are recalled below.

Jet spaces of submanifolds

More generally, all the projections   are fibre bundles.

Prolongations of submanifolds
The -jet prolongation of a submanifold  is

Cartan distribution on jet spaces

Differential equations 
A differential equation of order  on the manifold  is a submanifold ; a solution is defined to be an -dimensional submanifold  such that . While jet bundles are enough to deal with many equations arising in geometry, jet spaces of submanifolds provide a greater generality, used to tackle several PDEs imposed on submanifolds of a given manifold, such as Lagrangian submanifolds and minimal surfaces.

As in the jet bundle case, the Cartan distribution is important in the algebro-geometric approach to differential equations because it allows to encode solutions in purely geometric terms.

One can also look at the Cartan distribution of a PDE  more intrinsically, definingIn this sense, the pair  encodes the information about the solutions of the differential equation .

Prolongations of PDEs 
However, such an intersection is not necessarily a manifold again, hence  may not be an equation of order .

Below we will assume that the PDE is formally integrable, i.e. all prolongations  are smooth manifolds and all projections  are smooth surjective submersions. Note that a suitable version of Cartan–Kuranishi prolongation theorem guarantees that, under minor regularity assumptions, checking the smoothness of a finite number of prolongations is enough. Then the inverse limit of the sequence  extends the definition of prolongation to the case when  goes to infinity, and the space  has the structure of a profinite-dimensional manifold.

Definition of a diffiety

An elementary diffiety is a pair  where  is a -th order differential equation on some manifold,  its infinite prolongation and  its Cartan distribution. Note that, unlike in the finite case, one can show that the Cartan distribution  is -dimensional and involutive. However, due to the infinite-dimensionality of the ambient manifold, the Frobenius theorem does not hold, therefore  is not integrable

A diffiety is a triple , consisting of

 a (generally infinite-dimensional) manifold 
 the algebra of its smooth functions 
 a finite-dimensional distribution ,

Here locally means a suitable localisation with respect to the Zariski topology corresponding to the algebra .

Morphisms of diffieties 
A morphism between two diffieties  and  consists of a smooth map  whose pushforward preserves the Cartan distribution, i.e. such that, for every point , one has .

Diffieties together with their morphisms define the category of differential equations.

Applications

Vinogradov sequence

The Vinogradov -spectral sequence (or, for short, Vinogradov sequence) is a spectral sequence associated to a diffiety, which can be used to investigate certain properties of the formal solution space of a differential equation by exploiting its Cartan distribution .

Given a diffiety , consider the algebra of differential forms over  

and the corresponding de Rham complex:

Its cohomology groups  contain some structural information about the PDE; however, due to the Poincaré Lemma, they all vanish locally. In order to extract much more and even local information, one thus needs to take the Cartan distribution into account and introduce a more sophisticated sequence. To this end, let 

be the submodule of differential forms over  whose restriction to the distribution  vanishes, i.e.

Note that  is actually a differential ideal since it is stable w.r.t. to the de Rham differential, i.e. .

Then one obtains a filtration

and since all ideals  are stable, this filtration completely determines the following spectral sequence:

The filtration above is finite in each degree, i.e. for every 

so that the spectral sequence converges to the de Rham cohomology  of the diffiety. One can therefore analyse the terms of the spectral sequence order by order to recover information on the original PDE. For instance:
  corresponds to action functionals constrained by the PDE .
Many higher-order terms do not have an interpretation yet.

Variational bicomplex 
As a particular case, starting with a fibred manifold  and its jet bundle  instead of the jet space , instead of the -spectral sequence one obtains the slightly less general variational bicomplex.
More precisely, any bicomplex determines two spectral sequences: one of the two spectral sequences determined by the variational bicomplex is exactly the Vinogradov -spectral sequence. However, the variational bicomplex was developed independently from the Vinogradov sequence.

Similarly to the terms of the spectral sequence, many terms of the variational bicomplex can be given a physical interpretation in classical field theory: for example, one obtains cohomology classes corresponding to action functionals, conserved currents, gauge charges, etc.

Secondary calculus 
Vinogradov developed a theory, known as secondary calculus, to formalise in cohomological terms the idea of a differential calculus on the space of solutions of a given system of PDEs (i.e. the space of integral manifolds of a given diffiety).

In other words, secondary calculus provides substitutes for functions, vector fields, differential forms, differential operators, etc., on a (generically) very singular space where these objects cannot be defined in the usual (smooth) way on the space of solution. Furthermore, the space of these new objects are naturally endowed with the same algebraic structures of the space of the original objects.

More precisely, consider the horizontal De Rham complex  of a diffiety, which can be seen as the leafwise de Rham complex of the involutive distribution or, equivalently, the Lie algebroid complex of the Lie algebroid . Then the complex  becomes naturally a commutative DG algebra together with a suitable differential . Then, possibly tensoring with the normal bundle , its cohomology is used to define the following "secondary objects":

 secondary functions are elements of the cohomology , which is naturally a commutative DG algebra (it is actually the first page of the -spectral sequence discussed above);
 secondary differential -forms are elements of the cohomology , which is naturally a commutative DG algebra.

Secondary calculus can also be related to the covariant Phase Space, i.e. the solution space of the Euler-Lagrange equations associated to a Lagrangian field theory.

See also
 Secondary calculus and cohomological physics
 Partial differential equations on Jet bundles
 Differential ideal
 Differential calculus over commutative algebras
Another way of generalizing ideas from algebraic geometry is differential algebraic geometry.

References

External links
 The Diffiety Institute (frozen since 2010)
 The Levi-Civita Institute (successor of above site)
 Geometry of Differential Equations
 Differential Geometry and PDEs

Homological algebra
Partial differential equations
Differential geometry
Manifolds